Louise DuArt (born October 30, 1950) is an American comedian and impersonator.

Career
DuArt was born in Quincy, Massachusetts. She began her career on the children's show The Krofft Supershow playing Nashville, a member of the fictional band Kaptain Kool and the Kongs. She later worked on Krofft's final kids' show, The Krofft Superstar Hour, in which Kaptain Kool and the Kongs were replaced with the Bay City Rollers; DuArt remained as a voice actor. She also hosted the game show Rodeo Drive in 1990, on Lifetime, wherein she did celebrity and character impersonations at times, especially during the show's second round of play; her notable impersonations include Edith Bunker, George Burns, Judge Judy, Joan Rivers and Barbara Walters. At around this time she also did voices on Garfield and Friends. DuArt toured with Harvey Korman and Tim Conway from 2001 to 2005. She now makes appearances on many religious-themed programs.

Credits

Television
Family Guy (voice) (2001)
Bonkers (voice) (1993)
Garfield and Friends (voice) (1993)
Tiny Toon Adventures (voice) (1993)
Louise DuArt: The Mouth That Roared (1989, Showtime special)
Rodeo Drive (1990)
Cafe DuArt
Living the Life
D.C. Follies (voice) (1987)
Hollywood Squares (panelist) (1986–1989, 2004)
Off the Wall (1986)
The Krofft Superstar Hour (1978)
American Bandstand (guest with Kaptain Kool & the Kongs) (1977)
Kaptain Kool and the Kongs Present ABC All-Star Saturday (1977)
The Krofft Supershow (1976)
Jimmy Osmond Presents ABC's Saturday Sneak Peek (1976)
The World of Sid & Marty Krofft at the Hollywood Bowl (1973)

Stage
Together Again
Many Voices Of Louise DuArt
Glued To The Tube
Catskills On Broadway
Dreamstuff
Me & Jezebel

External links
Official Website

1950 births
Living people
American women comedians
American impressionists (entertainers)
American voice actresses
People from Quincy, Massachusetts
20th-century American actresses
Comedians from Massachusetts
Actresses from Massachusetts
20th-century American comedians
21st-century American women